Damian Zimoń (born 25 October 1934) is metropolitan archbishop emeritus of the Roman Catholic Archdiocese of Katowice.

He was born in Niedobczyce, now a district of Rybnik. In 1992 the rank of bishop of Katowice was upgraded to that of an archbishop, as the diocese became an archdiocese, and Zimoń became the first Archbishop of Katowice.

References
Archbishop Damian Zimoń on catholic-hierarchy.org

1934 births
Living people
Pontifical University of John Paul II alumni
20th-century Roman Catholic archbishops in Poland
21st-century Roman Catholic archbishops in Poland
People from Rybnik